Ngā Taonga Sound & Vision (Operating name for The New Zealand Archive of Film, Television and Sound Ngā Taonga Whitiāhua Me Ngā Taonga Kōrero.) is an archive that was launched on 31 July 2014, following the completion of a three-year process whereby the New Zealand Film Archive "absorbed" the collections and operations of the RNZ Sound Archives Ngā Taonga Kōrero in 2012 and the Television New Zealand Archive in 2014.

Purpose
Ngā Taonga Sound & Vision identifies itself as New Zealand's audiovisual archive, with a purpose of collecting, sharing and caring for New Zealand's audiovisual taonga.

Structure

Independent charitable trust
Ngā Taonga Sound & Vision is an independent charitable trust (CC22250).  It identifies itself as a Tier 2 public benefit entity (PBE).  It was originally called The New Zealand Film Archive, incorporated under the Charitable Trusts Act 1957 on 9 March 1981. The name was changed to The New Zealand Archive of Film, Television and Sound Ngā Taonga Whitiāhua Me Ngā Taonga Kōrero, effective 1 July 2014.  Ngā Taonga Sound & Vision's new name was officially launched by the Minister for Broadcasting Craig Foss on 31 July 2014.

Constitution and Kaupapa
Ngā Taonga Sound & Vision retained the Constitution and Kaupapa of The New Zealand Film Archive when it was founded in 2014.

Bicultural organisation
Ngā Taonga Sound & Vision adopted its bicultural framework from the New Zealand Film Archive when the new archive was established in mid-2014.

The archive identifies itself as a bicultural organisation that upholds the principles of the Treaty of Waitangi in its policies and practices. The Treaty is part of the Archive's Kaupapa, which in turn is part of the archive's Constitution. At all times there are three people on the Board of Trustees that represent Māori interests "through their own heritage and/or their connections with iwi and iwi interests."

However Ngā Taonga Sound & Vision's Strategic Plan 2016-2024 published in mid-2016, noted that the term bi-culturalism allowed archive staff to opt-out of kaupapa-centred activities.  Even the term kaupapa-centred was largely undefined. Staff had limited knowledge of mana whenua histories and significant places.  Both non-Māori and Māori staff felt culturally unsafe at the archive, with organisational policies and procedures not reflecting a kaupapa-centred approach.

In May 2016 the Board of Trustees retired the Board's Bicultural Committee and resolved that the Chief Executive would report to the Board on matters relating to the kaupapa of the organisation.

Taha Māori
The Taha Māori working group within Ngā Taonga Sound & Vision was developed during the 2012-2014 transformation process. Specialist Māori language and programme staff were seconded to a working group to develop Taha Māori programming and activities within the archive.

The major operational restructure of the Archive in 2014 saw the establishment of the Taha Māori department to "address the needs of Māori collections and users".  The department saw rapid growth, with expenditure rising from $54,257 in 2013/14 to $413,692 in 2014/15. However, in July 2016 an operational restructure saw the disestablishment of the Taha Māori department, with its staff split and absorbed into other departments.

External engagement with iwi and Māori
At the time of publication in mid-2016, Ngā Taonga Sound & Vision's Strategic Plan 2016-2014 noted that there was no work programme to address relationships with iwi and Māori.  The archive had eight expired Memoranda of Understanding with various iwi, and little connection with urban Māori.  The archive didn't engage with Māori audiences and used English as its primary language for on and off-line services, with only elements of Te Reo.

Patron
After becoming Governor-General of New Zealand in September 2016, Dame Patsy Reddy took on the role of Patron of Ngā Taonga Sound & Vision. In the late 1980s Dame Patsy was the Chair of the New Zealand Film Archive's Board of Trustees. Later she became the Chair of the New Zealand Film Commission.

Board of trustees
The Board of Ngā Taonga Sound & Vision is composed of six Trustees. Each Trustee can be on the Board for a maximum of 2 three-year terms. The Trustees can also co-opt other people onto the Board as needed. Trustees are paid an honoraria of $10,000 each annually.  The Chair is also paid an additional $10,000 annually. The Chair must be a current Trustee and is appointed by the Board on an annual basis. Even though Ngā Taonga Sound & Vision is largely a tax-payer funded organisation, it is not a Crown entity and the Board is solely responsible for identifying and appointing Trustees.

Chair of the board of trustees
Ngā Taonga Sound & Vision's founding Chair of the Board of Trustees was Jane Kominik.
Ms Kominik was previously the Chair of The New Zealand Film Archive. She had earlier been Deputy Chief Executive of the Ministry for Culture and Heritage when it was established in 1991. Ms Kominik's term as Chair of Ngā Taonga ended on 30 June 2017. In February 2018 current Chair Simon Murdoch reflected on Ms Kominik's time leading the archive "Her wise and steady leadership during a time of such dramatic change always inspired confidence that the organisation was heading in the right direction."

Simon Murdoch was appointed Chair in mid-2017. Mr Murdoch also sits on the Performance & Appointments Committee and the Property & Fundraising Committee. Prior to his involvement with the archive, Mr Murdoch was in the media spotlight as head of the Government Communications Security Bureau, presiding over the illegal surveillance of Kim Dotcom.

Trustees
Ngā Taonga Sound & Vision's founding Board of Trustees were all previous Trustees of The New Zealand Film Archive.  The founding Trustees were Louise Baker, Derek Fox, Judith Fyfe, Jane Kominik, Morris Love and Nathan Hoturoa Gray.

In 2015 Nathan Hoturoa Gray ceased being a Trustee and was replaced by Edie Te Hunapo Moke. In 2016 Louise Baker and Morris Love ceased being Trustees and were replaced by Simon Murdoch and Peter Tematakahere Douglas. In 2017 Peter Tematakahere Douglas and Derek Fox ceased being Trustees and were replaced by Te Raumawhitu Kupenga and Lisa Bates (co-opted to assist with fundraising). In October 2017 Whetu Fala became a Trustee to "represent Māori interests", and in December Jane Kominik and Judith Fyfe ceased being Trustees. In January 2018 Emily Loughnan and Lisa Bates became Trustees.

Chief Executive Officer
Ngā Taonga Sound & Vision's founding Chief Executive Officer was Frank Stark. After twenty-two years of being Chief Executive of the New Zealand Film Archive, and then latterly the Chief Executive of Ngā Taonga Sound & Vision he resigned in February 2015. Huia Kopua became the Acting Chief Executive during the first months of 2015. Ms Kopua also held the role of Pou Ārahi Deputy Chief Executive.

Rebecca Elvy was seconded from the Ministry of Education and appointed Acting Chief Executive on 2 March 2015. Before her appointment, Ms Elvy was Associate Deputy Secretary, Education Payroll Services at the Ministry of Education and often appeared in the media when issues with Novopay made the news. Ms Elvy was appointed as Chief Executive for a five-year term beginning 1 May 2015. Ms Elvy also operates a management website to "help people lead inspired, intentional, impactful lives, so that we can change the world for the better".

Leadership team
The founding leadership team at Ngā Taonga Sound & Vision in 2014 were the leadership team from the New Zealand Film Archive. The team included Sarah Davy (Operations), Jamie Lean (Standards), Huia Kopua (Deputy Chief Executive), Karen Neill (Partnership), Diane Pivac (Audience) and Frank Stark (Chief Executive Officer). Prior to the RNZ Sound Archive amalgamation in 2012, Karen Neill was head of RNZ Sound Archives, and between 1 October 2012 - 1 July 2014 was Director Radio at The New Zealand Film Archive.

In 2015 the leadership team included Sarah Davy (Operations), Rebecca Elvy (Chief Executive Officer), Jamie Lean (Standards), Huia Kopua (Pou Ārahi Deputy Chief Executive), Karen Neill (Partnership) and Diane Pivac (Audience).

In 2016 the leadership team included Sarah Davy (Operations/Information Services), Rebecca Elvy (Chief Executive Officer), Jamie Lean (Standards/Collection Services), Honiana Love (Pou Ārahi – Strategic Advisor, Māori), Charlotte McInnes (Chief Operating Officer), Karen Neill (Partnership), Hohepa Patea (Taha Māori) and Diane Pivac (Audience).

In 2017 the leadership team included Sarah Davy (Information Services), Rebecca Elvy (Chief Executive Officer), Jamie Lean (Collection Services), Honiana Love (Pou Ārahi – Strategic Advisor, Māori), Jackie Hay (Outreach and Engagement) and Charlotte McInnes (Chief Operating Officer).

Remuneration

Employees

Number of employees
The employee figures below were sourced from the annual returns Ngā Taonga Sound & Vision files with Charities Services under the Charities Act 2005. Figures prior to the 2014/15 financial year represent employee numbers of The New Zealand Film Archive and are included for reference purposes.

In November 2017 Ngā Taonga Sound & Vision supplied the Minister for Arts, Culture and Heritage with the following figures: by 2010 approximately 50 FTE (full-time equivalent), 2012 saw an increase of 10 FTE with the absorption of the RNZ Sound Archives, 2014 saw an increase of 11 FTE with the absorption of the TVNZ Archive.

Ngā Taonga Sound & Vision noted that once ongoing funding commenced in 2014 there were 61.6 FTE positions. However the Archive's annual report in 2014/15 noted that it had 80 staff, and in its briefing to the incoming Minister in 2014 Ngā Taonga Sound & Vision said that it had 75 staff - 47 in Wellington, 12 in Christchurch, 4 in Auckland, and 12 at Avalon.

Employee engagement
Ngā Taonga Sound & Vision surveys employee engagement annually.

In October 2017 the Board discussed the employee engagement survey and sought the Chief Executive's commitment to meaningful action planning and activity.

Employee snapshot (2016)
Ngā Taonga Sound & Vision's Strategic Plan 2016-2014 published in mid-2016 summarised employee-related issues.  These included an aging workforce with low turnover and minimal knowledge management; employees not empowered to use their own initiative; a scattergun approach to professional development and employees not supported because of poor processes. The archive also noted that it was not actively monitoring the mental, physical, emotional and spiritual well-being of staff.

Transparency and accountability
Ngā Taonga Sound & Vision's kaupapa calls for the Archive to "maintain and defend its own professional integrity, independence and judgment in its role as a publicly accountable body". On 12 July 2016 Ngā Taonga Sound & Vision launched its Strategic Plan 2016–2024. Chair of Ngā Taonga Sound & Vision Jane Kominik said it was "the result of much honest self-appraisal".

The Strategic Plan not only set out "an ambitious direction and challenging goals", but also clearly documented "a range of factors that create real challenges for us and our clients". This included highlighting ongoing issues with the integration between the three archives, issues with management, iwi engagement, buildings, clients, work processes, diversity of audiences, education activities and a heavy reliance on government funding.

For two years, from October 2014 to October 2016 the Board of Trustees published a report of each Board meeting online. From December 2016 only summaries are published.

In November 2016, opposition MP Jacinda Ardern questioned the Minister for Arts, Culture and Heritage Maggie Barry over whether she considered it satisfactory that Ngā Taonga Sound & Vision, a private trust, be "not answerable in any formal or legal way to the people of New Zealand except through temporary funding contracts." Ms Ardern was told that Ngā Taonga was accountable through its agreement with the Ministry for Culture and Heritage. Ms Ardern also asked Ms Barry if she had "considered turning Ngā Taonga into a crown entity; if not, why not?"  Ms Barry replied that "no, the current arrangements are working well". Ngā Taonga Sound & Vision itself says it is "accountable to all New Zealanders as it collects and cares for audiovisual taonga on their behalf."

Ministerial working group
In June 2018, Internal Affairs Minister Tracey Martin and the Associate Minister for Arts, Culture and Heritage Grant Robertson announced a National Archival and Library Institutions Ministerial Group.  As part of its remit, the group will "investigate options for ensuring Ngā Taonga Sound & Vision has appropriate governance, and a sustainable structure and funding (this will include a consideration of whether Ngā Taonga Sound & Vision  should be established as a Crown entity)". The working group includes Internal Affairs Minister Tracey Martin, Associate Minister for Arts, Culture and Heritage Grant Robertson, Minister of State Services Chris Hipkins, Minister for Māori Development Nanaia Mahuta and the Minister for Government Digital Services and Associate Minister of State Services Clare Curran.  The group is due to report back to Cabinet by the end of 2018.

Agreements
Ngā Taonga Sound & Vision has signed agreements, or is made reference to in agreements with various external agencies including Government departments and independent Charitable Trusts. These include:

Licence to Occupy Archive Facility (Avalon), between the Ministry for Culture and Heritage and Ngā Taonga Sound & Vision.
Memorandum of Understanding - Access to TVNZ Archive Collection, between the Ministry for Culture and Heritage and the Department of Internal Affairs.
Memorandum of Understanding between the Digital Media Trust (NZ On Screen) and Ngā Taonga Sound & Vision.
Memorandum of Understanding between the Minister of Arts, Culture and Heritage and Ngā Taonga Sound & Vision.
Transfer of sound archive material and related assets, and on-going provision of services, between RNZ, Sound Archives and The New Zealand Film Archive.

Professional memberships
At February 2017, Ngā Taonga Sound & Vision was a member of the following associations: Association of Moving Image Archivists (AMIA), Association for Recorded Sound Collections (ARSC), Fédération Internationale des Archives du Film (FIAF), Fédération Internationale des Archives du Television (FIAT), International Association of Sound and Audiovisual Archives (IASA) and the South East Asia and Pacific Audio-Visual Archives Association (SEAPAVAA).

Previously Ngā Taonga Sound & Vision had been a member of the following associations, but their current membership status is unknown: Archives and Records Association of New Zealand (ARANZ), Australasian Sound Recordings Association (ASRA) and the National Oral History Association of New Zealand (NOHANZ).

During Ngā Taonga Sound & Vision's restructure in 2016 the Association of Moving Image Archivists and the Archives and Records Association of New Zealand raised formal concerns with the Minister for Arts, Culture and Heritage Maggie Barry, opposition MP Jacinda Ardern and Ngā Taonga Sound & Vision.

Restructures

Restructure (2012-14)
Between November 2012 and April 2014 the New Zealand Film Archive undertook a major review of its governance, structure and capability at the request of the Minister for Arts, Culture and Heritage Chris Finlayson.  This followed the transfer of the RNZ Sound Archive in October 2012, and the upcoming transfer of the TVNZ Archive on 1 August 2014.

Chair of Ngā Taonga Sound & Vision Jane Kominik noted that it had been almost two years of review and rebuilding.  The result was a new constitution, a new way of electing board members and a new operational structure.  The new structure came into effect on 1 July 2014 and became the founding structure of Ngā Taonga.

The long-standing function based structure of "collect, protect and connect" employed by the archive was replaced with a structure that put the Treaty of Waitangi partnership at its centre. As part of this, the Taha Māori department was established.  The new structure aimed to be audience-focused, standards-based, collaborative and provide value for money.

Notably, the Radio Division (i.e. the former RNZ Sound Archive) and the senior management role of Director Radio was disestablished by the restructure, less than two years after the RNZ Sound Archive amalgamation. Radio Division staff were split and absorbed into the newly created departments.

At 1 August 2014, apart from Karen Neill (Head of Partnerships and former Director Radio), there were no former TVNZ Archive or RNZ Sound Archive staff employed in a management capacity within Ngā Taonga Sound & Vision.

The 2013/14 Annual Report noted "the successful completion of the process to bring together the management and operations of the Film Archive and the Sound Archives." Chief Executive Officer Frank Stark resigned from the archive in February 2015 and was replaced by Rebecca Elvy in March. Chair of Ngā Taonga Sound & Vision Jane Kominik noted in the 2014/15 Annual Report that the challenge ahead for the archive was to "retain the integrity of the constituent collections whilst providing integrated services and access".

Restructure (2015-16)
The staff and collections of the TVNZ Archive were amalgamated with Ngā Taonga Sound & Vision in August 2014.  In 2015 Ngā Taonga restructured the former TVNZ Archive staff, and then in July 2016 Ngā Taonga changed its operational structure. The restructure saw the departure of two members of the leadership team and the disestablishment of the Taha Māori group, with its staff split and absorbed into the newly created departments.

Restructure (2016-17)

Restructure details
The 2016/17 staff restructure followed on from the operational restructure of July 2016.

The restructure proposal was announced to Ngā Taonga Sound & Vision staff on 7 November 2016. It was labeled by the archive as the first significant change since the three organisations had come together. On 9 December the archive confirmed that it would centralise its collections from Auckland and Christchurch to the former TVNZ Avalon facility in Lower Hutt, and that five jobs would be lost.

The restructure saw many staff disestablished. Staff had to apply for new roles, and in some cases relocate to Wellington. Released under an Official Information Act request, correspondence from a redacted individual to the Prime Minister John Key noted that the biggest loss would occur in Collection Services - which encompassed the acquisition and conservation areas.  Out of a total of 35 current positions in that department, 33 (94% of the staff) would be disestablished or ended, with the guarantee of fewer positions available in the new structure.

The restructure was largely implemented by April 2017. Employee figures from 30 June 2017 showed that there had been a decrease from 80 to 61 full-time positions since 30 June 2016, but an increase of 13 part-time positions at the archive.

Christchurch closure
One of the main aspects of the restructure was the closure of the former RNZ Sound Archives audio preservation facilities in Christchurch and the relocation of 100,000 collection items to Wellington.
 Sound Archives had been based in the South Island since 1956, and located in central Christchurch since 1992.

Staff and unions raised concerns about the move, including whether the material could be safely transferred. Union members also said the relocation went against promises made by the Minister of Arts, Culture and Heritage Chris Finlayson to keep the archives in Christchurch following the 2011 Christchurch earthquake.  Ngā Taonga Sound & Vision's Strategic Plan 2016-2024 published in July 2016 also noted that the archive was "committed to remaining in Christchurch as part of the Canterbury recovery."

Contrary to the sentiment expressed in the Strategic Plan, an Archives New Zealand email released under the Official Information Act, noted that Ngā Taonga Sound & Vision Chief Executive Rebecca Elvy had advised Archives New Zealand at the start of August 2016 that the political pressure to have the sound archives in Christchurch had been removed, and that the archive was not wedded to keeping the archive in that region.  Ms Elvy was interested in Palmerston North as an alternative site.

A fact sheet provided by Ngā Taonga Sound & Vision to Minister Maggie Barry noted that even though it wanted to close the Christchurch operation it would be "increasing the level of activity and visibility that Cantabrians have to all of the collections". This was likely to include Christchurch-based partnerships with galleries, cinemas, archives, museums and libraries.

Political involvement
The Office of Hon Maggie Barry worked closely with the Ministry for Culture and Heritage and Ngā Taonga Sound & Vision to formulate a set of consistent responses that could be used by the Minister and others. The text was circulated to other Ministers' Offices as suggested responses to media or stakeholder enquires.

Two weeks prior to the restructure being confirmed, opposition Labour MP Jacinda Ardern submitted seven written questions to the Minister for Arts, Culture and Heritage Maggie Barry regarding the proposed restructure. The most notable question which was later highlighted by RNZ news, was "Does the Minister consider it satisfactory that much of New Zealand's audio-visual heritage is in the hands of a private trust which is not answerable in any formal or legal way to the people of New Zealand except through temporary funding contracts?" Ms Ardern was told that Ngā Taonga Sound & Vision was accountable through its agreement with the Ministry for Culture and Heritage. And later, in response to an Official Information Act request Minister Barry wrote that "though significantly funded by government, Ngā Taonga is a non-government organisation and is responsible for its own organisational matters.  It would therefore be inappropriate for me as a Minister to interfere with Ngā Taonga's internal decision-making."

The New Zealand First Party said that relocating the national sound archives from Christchurch to Wellington was a direct result of the government's obsession with centralisation. New Zealand First Leader Winston Peters said "The wisdom of shifting archives to an area which is considered an earthquake risk in which 60 buildings were closed after the recent Kaikoura earthquake with some having to be demolished, must also be questioned. The plan was only announced to staff on 7 November and has been rushed through without professional risk management or sufficient input from the cultural heritages sector."

National concern
The Archives and Records Association of New Zealand wrote to Minister Maggie Barry and opposition MP Jacinda Ardern to express their concerns with the restructure. The Association noted that relocating all of the collections to Wellington "increases the risk of damage to these collections due to a severe earthquake or other natural disaster [...] A distributed collections model with the archives held in three separate regions lowers the risk to the total collection." The Association also noted that "due to continual staffing cuts, due to rolling restructures, most repositories and archives (government, private and charitable) are facing large backlogs of historic collections awaiting processing.  It would be disappointing if the effect of the Ngā Taonga review would be to compound any such backlog."

Mayor of Christchurch Lianne Dalziel expressed concern to Minister Maggie Barry that the collections would be threatened by "centralised location in Wellington, which could be cut off for months" following a natural disaster. Ms Dalziel said she would be disappointed if Ngā Taonga Sound & Vision did not have a future alongside other institutions committed to supporting the city's regeneration following the 2011 Christchurch earthquake. Ms Dalziel also noted that Prime Minister Bill English had talked about the Government's ongoing commitment to Christchurch in his 2016 Budget Speech.

The Public Service Association said that decades of institutional knowledge would be lost. PSA National Secretary Erin Polaczuk said "We understand there has been little consultation with the wider heritage sector, which is concerned about the fragility of the archive, and the expertise needed to administer it."  She went on to say "This is the third round of restructuring in the four years since the Film and Sound archives merged, and the impact on staff can't be underestimated."

Film researcher Dr Emma Kelly campaigned against the move saying valuable heritage material and expertise would be lost. Dr Kelly began an online petition calling for the restructure to be stopped to allow "iwi, users, viewers and other communities have a say". The petition was presented to the Minister for Arts, Culture and Heritage Maggie Barry and Chair of Ngā Taonga Sound & Vision Jane Kominik.

International concern
The restructuring drew international concern from the Association of Moving Image Archivists who wrote to Minister Maggie Barry, opposition MP Jacinda Ardern, Chair of Ngā Taonga Sound & Vision Jane Kominik and Chief Executive Rebecca Elvy strongly "urging caution and broad consultation before committing to any action".  The Association believed that the restructure could have "detrimental consequences for the staff and the collections they conserve", and may pose major risks to the long term stability of the collections.

Cutbacks flagged (2017/18)
In December 2017 Ngā Taonga Sound & Vision confirmed to RNZ news that unless it got an increase in government funding it would make cutbacks. The news report followed Ngā Taonga's briefing to Jacinda Ardern, the incoming Prime Minister and Minister for Arts, Culture and Heritage. The briefing noted that if funding was maintained at its current level the archive would need to reduce its accountabilities.

Restructure (2020)
In October 2020, a major restructure was announced, involving the disestablishment of 29 roles. Recent departee Lawrence Wharerau, former archivist and senior curator of Māori content, described the restructure as the "sixth in seven years".

In December 2020, the Department of Internal Affairs confirmed that Ngā Taonga Sound & Vision along with Archives New Zealand and the National Library of New Zealand would relocate to a new purpose built business park called the Horowhenua Business Park in Levin at an unspecified date.

Accommodation
Ngā Taonga Sound & Vision's headquarters are based in the Wellington region, although it takes its "national role seriously and work[s] hard to offer access throughout the country." In November 2017, Ngā Taonga Sound & Vision noted that since it was established in 2014 it had consolidated its property portfolio: from nine facilities in three regions, to five facilities in one region, with two small satellite offices in Auckland and Christchurch. In December 2018 the Auckland office was closed.

Current locations

Avalon (Lower Hutt)
Prior to the 2016/17 restructure at Ngā Taonga Sound & Vision, the TVNZ Archive collection was the only collection stored permanently at the former TVNZ Archive facility at 181A Taita Drive, Lower Hutt.  Since the restructure, the majority of the archive's physical collection items have been moved there. The building contains 20 km worth of climate-controlled storage. In 2014 twelve staff worked there.

The facility and land are owned by the Crown and managed by the Department of Internal Affairs. In 2014 the Ministry for Culture and Heritage appointed Ngā Taonga Sound & Vision as the initial Archive Manager, giving it the right to occupy the publicly owned facility.  The occupancy conditions are documented in the Licence to Occupy Archive Facility and in the Memorandum of Understanding - Access to TVNZ Archive Collection, between the Ministry for Culture and Heritage and the Department of Internal Affairs.

As Archive Manager, Ngā Taonga is allowed to use the fixtures and fittings in the facility in connection with managing the TVNZ Archive collection. This includes items such as the archive shelving and air-conditioning system. Ngā Taonga Sound & Vision can only undertake minor alterations (such as painting a wall) at the Avalon facility.  Larger alterations need the consent of the Department of Internal Affairs.

The Department of Internal Affairs is responsible for building maintenance, paying charges for building services, security service charges, exterior cleaning and grounds maintenance. The Ministry for Culture and Heritage and Ngā Taonga Sound & Vision are responsible for the maintenance of the TVNZ Archive equipment. Ngā Taonga Sound & Vision is responsible for paying utility charges (water, gas, electricity etc.), rubbish collection, internal cleaning and provisioning of toilets and any other shared facilities. They do not pay any rent or occupancy fees.

Unit 51, Hazeldean Business Park (Christchurch, 2018-)
Ngā Taonga Sound & Vision has a small satellite office located within the Hazeldean shared office business centre in Addington. Visits are by appointment only.

Taranaki Street (Wellington, 2002-2019)
The New Zealand Film Archive purchased the 84 Taranaki Street property in 2002 for $2.5 million. It is a six-level building which houses a 107-seat cinema, the Jonathan Dennis research library, a media library, as well as offices and technical facilities. After the 2014 amalgamation, it became the head office of Ngā Taonga. 69 staff and 4 volunteers were based there in 2014, although the archive reported to the incoming Minister for Arts, Culture and Heritage that the building only had 47 staff.

In its Strategic Plan 2016-2024 published in mid-2016, Ngā Taonga Sound & Vision itself described the building as: cold and uninviting with nothing to see or do unless you are attending the cinema. The building was not insulated and required a new lift and roof, plus a heating/cooling/humidity control system. The Jonathan Dennis Library was rarely open and accessible. The cinema was uncomfortable and cold and not large enough.  The media library was dark and contained predominantly video formats which were becoming obsolete.

The building is considered earthquake-prone by the Wellington City Council and was given a yellow notice. The yellow notice requires the building owner to either strengthen the building or demolish all or part of it. In November 2017 Ngā Taonga signaled to the Minister for Culture and Heritage that it would need to exit the earthquake-prone site and further consolidate its property footprint.  In early 2018 a newly incorporated company became the owner of the property. Under the terms of sale Ngā Taonga is leasing back the building.

Molesworth St (Wellington, 2019-)
In 2019 it was announced that Ngā Taonga Sound & Vision would relocate its archives to the National Library of New Zealand on Molesworth St, due to earthquake concerns over the Taranaki St building.

Collection locations
The majority of New Zealand's audiovisual heritage, managed by Ngā Taonga Sound & Vision, is stored in the Wellington region.

Since 2017 Ngā Taonga Sound & Vision has stored most of its physical collection in the Avalon facility in Lower Hutt.  The facility is owned by the Crown and managed by the Department of Internal Affairs. It has four vaults: a cold vault, a documentation vault, a general vault and a temporary vault. The cold vault has a temperature of 7-8C which is higher than best practice conditions for the storage of film (2-4C), and the temporary vault which now holds the former Sound Archives acetate disc collection does not meet best practice conditions.

Ngā Taonga Sound & Vision lease the Map Room in a two-storey underground bunker built into Mount Cook.  The site is referred to in corporate documents as Buckle Street. Constructed during World War II, the bunker and tunnels are located underground behind the former Dominion Museum building, with an operational entrance next to Wellington High School on Taranaki Street. The storage area contains film, large equipment and paper documentation.  In 2012/13 the store was reorganised and filled to 85% of capacity. The vault reaches temperatures over 18C, well above best practice conditions for the storage of film (2-4C) and paper based documentation (13-18C).

Ngā Taonga Sound & Vision purchased 21 Northpoint Street, Plimmerton for $253,590 in September 2009. In 2011 the archive built a purpose-built storage facility to hold data tapes, film and video masters. The facility is referred to in corporate documents as Northpoint.  The temperature of the vault is currently around 15C, well above best practice conditions for the storage of film (2-4C).

There are two vaults at Ngā Taonga Sound & Vision's head office at 84 Taranaki Street, Wellington - a cold vault and a documentation vault. The archive notes that the cold vault is poorly sealed and that the documentation vault lacks humidity control. The entire building is also considered earthquake-prone.

A purpose-built, 100 square metre climate controlled nitrate film vault was built in Titahi Bay in partnership with Archives New Zealand in 2013 on land owned by Radio New Zealand. The vault is referred to in corporate documents as Whitireia. Archives New Zealand contributed $100,000 towards the project which cost in total $366,000. After construction, Ngā Taonga moved four tonnes of flammable nitrate film from Makomako in North Wairarapa to the new vault over a one-week period.  The vault also holds nitrate collections from Archives New Zealand and the Museum of New Zealand Te Papa Tongarewa. Even though it was purpose-built by the archive and publicised as having "controlled preservation conditions", Ngā Taonga Sound & Vision now believes the storage conditions in the vault are below standard and not within best practice. Currently the nitrate film is stored at 15C, where ideally it should be stored between 2-4C. In 2018 public concerns were raised over the vault's close proximity to a newly proposed radio transmission mast, potentially heightening the risk of inadvertent ignition of flammable atmospheres by radio frequency radiation - particularly when archive staff do regular "wind-throughs" of nitrate film reels.

Former locations

Auckland
Ngā Taonga Sound & Vision had a satellite office located within Radio New Zealand House at 171 Hobson Street.
From April 2005 it housed a branch of RNZ Sound Archives.  The office was redeveloped circa 2014, with the construction of two studios, a separate tape cleaning area, on-site storage and a small office area. The sound studios were used to preserve the Ngā Taonga Kōrero audio collection. Ngā Taonga Sound & Vision moved the audio collection to Avalon as part of the 2016/17 restructure. In December 2015, staff from the former New Zealand Film Archive public facility in Karangahape Road moved to Hobson Street. Originally intended as a new public facility, the Hobson Street site was due to be refurbished and opened in early 2016. The site was to include a library and viewing spaces. However the branch remained closed to the public. Responding to news reports during the 2016 restructure, Ngā Taonga Sound & Vision said that there were no permanent collections in Auckland and that the facility only had two permanent staff who were in back-office roles. The Hobson Street branch was closed completely in December 2018.

Ngā Taonga Sound & Vision also had a branch site located at 300 Karangahape Road which was primarily moving-image focused. The facility, which was a former New Zealand Film Archive branch, was open to the public weekdays 11am-5pm, with free admission.  It had viewing and research facilities, along with a frequently changing exhibition space. The Auckland branch also held regular public screenings in association with partner institutions, including Auckland University of Technology and Colab. Six staff were based there in 2014. Ngā Taonga Sound & Vision closed the facility in December 2015, moving staff to the Hobson Street site.

Christchurch
324 Cashel Street was the former location of the RNZ Sound Archive, and latterly the location of the majority of Ngā Taonga's sound archiving operations. It was the site of the archive's largest audio storage vault, in which over 90,000 items were housed in controlled archival conditions. These included early audio cylinders, acetate discs, open reel tapes, cassette tapes and digital audio tapes.  The branch also held publicity materials and documentation relating to the sound collection. Preservation, cataloguing and client supply activities took place, and there were also public listening facilities (by appointment only). 10-12 staff were based there in 2014. As part of the 2016/17 restructure Ngā Taonga Sound & Vision closed the facility in the first half of 2017, moving the collection to Avalon and remaining staff to Blackheath Place, Christchurch.

After the closure of the Cashel Street location in 2017, Ngā Taonga Sound & Vision established a small satellite office located within the Blackheath Place office complex at 73 Durham Street South. The building is listed with Heritage New Zealand as an Historic Place Category 2. Visits were by appointment only. In early 2018 the office was relocated to shared business accommodation in Addington.

Former collection locations
In April 2005 RNZ Sound Archives moved the historic Ngā Taonga Kōrero audio collection to a purpose-built archive facility at RNZ's transmission site in Henderson, Auckland. The collection was relocated to Avalon as part of the 2016/17 restructure. The RNZ transmitter site at Titahi Bay also held parts of the RNZ Sound Archives collection.  This site was still being utilised by Ngā Taonga Sound & Vision after the amalgamation.

Attempts at co-location

Christchurch (2012-2015)
Following the 2011 Christchurch earthquake RNZ Christchurch and RNZ Sound Archives shared the same building at 324 Cashel Street. The 2012 transfer agreement between RNZ and the then New Zealand Film Archive, pointed in principle to both parties again cohabiting a new RNZ Christchurch facility that was being developed. The agreement pointed out that there was no legal obligation on either party to follow through with the accommodation proposal.

By January 2014, the archive was in discussions with the Department of Internal Affairs and the University of Canterbury over a possible combined site at Ilam.  This would house the former RNZ Sound Archives, be the South Island headquarters for Archives NZ and the location for the University Library archives.

In November 2014, Ngā Taonga Sound & Vision reported that the Department of Internal Affairs could find it difficult to meet the archive's preferred timetable to accommodate the long term needs of its sound archiving operations by 2016.  The archive said it would continue discussions with the Department but it would also re-enter conversations with RNZ over its accommodation in Christchurch.

Wigram (2015/16)
On 23 January 2015 an agreement was signed between Archives New Zealand and Ngā Taonga Sound & Vision in relation to co-locating the two archives in a proposed new specialised facility at Wigram, Christchurch. Ngā Taonga Sound & Vision said that it would bring the archive alongside other Christchurch heritage agencies and would "provide an enhanced public access service to the region".

Archives NZ is a part of the Department of Internal Affairs.  The Department led the co-location project, with the primary aim to build a new facility for Archives NZ in Christchurch after the 2011 earthquake damaged their Peterborough Street building and surrounding land. Ngā Taonga Sound & Vision would tenant 300 square metres of storage space, and have sound-proof preservation studios, office spaces and a front-of-house area.

Budget 2015 confirmed $6.1 million in operating funding (over 4 years) and $13 million of capital funding from the Future Investment Fund to build the new facility. Construction was scheduled to start in the second quarter of 2016. Internal Affairs Minister Peter Dunne said "The Archives project is good news for the people of Christchurch and a clear signal of the Government's intent to keep the Christchurch rebuild on-track".

The location of the new facility at Wigram followed Archives NZ negotiations with the New Zealand Defence Force. The two parties saw mutual benefit in having Archives NZ situated in close proximity to the Air Force Museum, as Archives NZ is the main primary research source for people researching New Zealand's military history.

Negotiations between Archives NZ and Ngā Taonga Sound & Vision were sometimes tense, with an Archives NZ contractor noting in an email that they would have to explain to Ngā Taonga "in words of one syllable".  Another internal Archives NZ email noted "the irony is [that] they are getting a really good deal with a purpose built design and fit out essentially free of charge and security of tenancy (and rent) in a volatile rental market."

By October 2015 the co-location was in jeopardy because of changing project timeframes. The Board of Ngā Taonga Sound & Vision requested an urgent investigation to find the cost differential between "access storage" and "preservation storage" options at the new facility. An internal Archives NZ email noted that Ngā Taonga Sound & Vision had "a number of difficult property decisions to make".

By early 2016 both parties were again committed, discussing specific building and furniture requirements. In July 2016 Ngā Taonga Sound & Vision had an operational restructure and then published its Strategic Plan 2016–2024.  As part of its strategic direction, the archive said it was "committed to remaining in Christchurch as part of the Canterbury recovery". However a couple of weeks later, an Archives New Zealand email noted that Ngā Taonga Sound & Vision Chief Executive Rebecca Elvy had advised them that the political pressure to have the sound archives in Christchurch had been removed, and that the archive was not wedded to keeping the archive in that region.

By mid-September a Department of Internal Affairs email noted that Ngā Taonga Sound & Vision were "pleading poverty" over the costs involved, and by 30 September 2016 Ngā Taonga Sound & Vision had withdrawn completely from the co-location project, pointing to their inability to pay the rental charges.

The late stage withdrawal saw the Department of Internal Affairs seeking other tenants.  An internal email noted that this would be much preferable to having to scale down the building.  Another internal email noted that "there was a lot of effort put into the design to accommodate [Ngā Taonga] which does have a cost implication".

Ngā Taonga Sound & Vision's Christchurch staff were told about the withdrawal in mid-October, and by early November a major staff restructuring was underway.  This would ultimately see the Christchurch preservation facility closed and all of the sound collections moved from Christchurch to Wellington in 2017.

Archives New Zealand continued the development of the Wigram facility at 15 Harvard Avenue which is due to be operational by mid-2018.

Funding

Core public funding

Ministry for Culture and Heritage
Ngā Taonga Sound & Vision receives core funding from the Ministry for Culture and Heritage from Vote Arts, Culture and Heritage. Over half of the $5 million annually received from the Ministry is for the management of the TVNZ Archive and RNZ Sound Archive collections.

Funding of the RNZ Sound Archives collection

In the 2011/12 financial year, NZ On Air funded RNZ Sound Archives $677,000. When the archive was transferred to Ngā Taonga Sound & Vision on 1 October 2012 an extra $300,000 per annum was allocated by the Government, bringing the Government's total annual investment in the sound collection close to $1 million.  After the transfer, funding was delivered via the Ministry for Culture and Heritage. The archive told the Ministry that it proposed to spend $1.5 million annually on audio archiving.

The annual income received from the Ministry for Culture and Heritage was initially ring-fenced for sound archiving. The New Zealand Film Archive received $790,368 for 2012/13 (part year), and $1 million in 2013/14. However, by 2014/15 the ring-fencing had disappeared and the $1 million for sound archiving had been channelled into a general fund.  Ngā Taonga Sound & Vision's general funding from the Ministry increased in that year from $2,020,000 to $3,019,700.

In 2011/12 before its transfer to Ngā Taonga Sound & Vision, RNZ Sound Archives had expenditure of $884,000. By 2014/15, Ngā Taonga Sound & Vision's Radio Division (i.e. the former RNZ Sound Archive) had expenditure of $823,335. However, by November 2016, and shortly before Ngā Taonga Sound & Vision closed the former RNZ Sound Archive preservation facility in Christchurch, the archive said it was only spending approximately $430,000 per annum to run the Christchurch operation. This included rent, salaries and office overheads.

Funding of the TVNZ Archive collection
In 2012 the Ministry for Culture and Heritage estimated the annual net cost to TVNZ of running the TVNZ Archive was between $0.5 and $1 million. For the 2014/15 year Ngā Taonga Sound & Vision received $1,590,000 from the Ministry for the ongoing "management, archiving and increased accessibility" of the TVNZ Archive collection.  Thereafter it received $2 million per year for the same purpose. Two documents were used to inform the initial Budget Bid for operating expenses by the Ministry for Culture and Heritage: a financial due diligence report from PriceWaterhouseCoopers and a proposal from the New Zealand Film Archive.

In May 2017 Chair of Ngā Taonga Sound & Vision Jane Kominik wrote to the Minister for Arts Culture and Heritage Maggie Barry noting that the archive was about to begin discussions with the Ministry for Culture and Heritage over two areas "for which Nga Taonga has never been funded": access to audiovisual collections beyond current levels and the digitisation of TVNZ Betacam and DigiBeta tape formats beyond business as usual levels.

In November 2017 Ngā Taonga Sound & Vision noted to the Minister for Arts, Culture and Heritage that activity-based costings were not conducted at the time of the TVNZ Archive transfer in 2014.

Te Māngai Pāho
Te Māngai Pāho provides funding to Ngā Taonga Sound & Vision for the archiving of television programmes broadcast by the Māori Television Service and the archiving of iwi radio programmes. In 2012/13 Ngā Taonga Sound & Vision entered into negotiations with Te Māngai Pāho to provide archiving services for the 21 iwi radio stations throughout the country.

NZ Lottery Grants Board
NZ Lottery Grants Board provides a fixed percentage of Lottery profits annually.  Ngā Taonga Sound & Vision is one of four agencies that receive this type of annual funding.

Fundraising efforts

Givealittle donation page
In March 2015 Ngā Taonga Sound & Vision created an online Givealittle donation page seeking financial contributions from the public. Givealittle is an online fundraising platform run by the Spark Foundation.

Ngā Taonga Sound and Vision Foundation
On 19 October 2017, the Governor-General of New Zealand Dame Patsy Reddy launched Ngā Taonga Sound & Vision's patronage programme at Government House, Wellington. The archive established the patronage programme because of uncertainty over funding. At its launch, the programme raised $18,943. The public donation programme initially highlighted the need to preserve and digitise 200,000 Betacam video tapes from the 1980s which were predominantly from the TVNZ Archive collection. Chief Executive of Ngā Taonga Sound & Vision Rebecca Elvy told RNZ news that it would cost $10–15 million to digitise the Betacam tapes, which otherwise would be lost forever when the technology vanished by 2025.

Collections
As well as acquiring new collection items, Ngā Taonga Sound & Vision manages three historic collections: the New Zealand Film Archive collection, the RNZ Sound Archives and the TVNZ Archive collection. Collectively, the RNZ Sound Archives and TVNZ Archive collections form the majority (65% at August 2014) of the total collection. They are considered public records under the Public Records Act 2005.

Variations in collection size
The table below shows the variation in the reported size of Ngā Taonga Sound & Vision's collections. The figures are drawn from official correspondence, documents and websites.

Notably the reported size of the TVNZ Archive collection dropped by 212,000 items between 2013 and 2017. As custodian of the TVNZ Archive Collection since 2014, the Ministry for Culture and Heritage has never audited the size of the collection.  It believes the significant drop in the reported size is because Ngā Taonga Sound & Vision is currently only estimating the size of the collection. The Ministry is waiting on the archive to complete an audit (due by August 2018). The archive will then share the methodology and total number of items with the Ministry.

New Zealand Film Archive collection
By 2012 the New Zealand Film Archive collection contained over 150,000 items including moving-images from 1895 to the present day.

The collection includes predominantly New Zealand features and short films, newsreels, documentaries, home movies, music videos, television programmes, commercials, experimental films and video art. The collection also contains items with significant Māori content, including records of karanga, whaikorero, iwi and hapu whakapapa, powhiri, wharenui and marae, kapa haka, Waitangi Day events (from 1934), raranga, tukutuku and whakairo.

There are also stills, posters, scripts, clippings, printed programmes, publicity material, production records and files, personal records, storyboards, props and costumes, animation cells, taped interviews, glass advertising slides, ephemera and equipment.

Dating to before the amalgamation of the TVNZ Archive collection, the New Zealand Film Archive maintained the National Television Collection on behalf of NZ on Air. This involved constantly recording off-air broadcasts including television news, dramas, documentaries, games shows, music videos, infomercials, youth programming and sport. Māori broadcasting was archived on behalf of Te Mangai Paho, the Māori Broadcasting Funding Agency.

The New Zealand Film Archive collection also holds the Chapman Collection.  Deposited by Professor Robert and Noeline Chapman of the Political Studies Department at Auckland University, the collection begins with audio recordings of television news from the 1960s. From 1984 the collection contains VHS recordings of nightly news bulletins. The Chapman collection precedes TVNZ's own archival collection of television news.

RNZ Sound Archive collection
In July 2012 the Ministry for Culture and Heritage authored a memorandum that in part outlined how the New Zealand Film Archive would be able to "protect and enhance" RNZ Sound Archive's work while growing the Film Archive's own business. The Ministry pointed to how the National Film and Sound Archive of Australia handled both sound and film without sound being a "poor relation" - a reason often cited for not merging the two activities.

As part of the document the Film Archive set out its vision for a combined archive. The Film Archive wanted to "bring the audio facilities up to the quality established over the last decade for the film and video operation". Within the new archive there would be a staff of over 60 specialists, and there would be an increase in money spent annually on audio archiving, from the current $884,000 to $1.5 million.

The new archive would put an emphasise on preservation and public accessibility: "Users will be able to access key sounds and images from the last 100 years and combine them in new television and radio programmes, exhibitions, websites, teaching materials and community projects." Greater access to the audio collections would come from adding an audio dimension to the Film Archive's medianet sites, research libraries in Wellington and Auckland and other community and educational initiatives.

The RNZ Sound Archive staff and collection were transferred to Ngā Taonga Sound & Vision on 1 October 2012. The contents of the collection are subject to the Public Records Act 2005.  In 2014 the collection was valued at $800,000. On 30 June 2016 RNZ transferred to Ngā Taonga Sound & Vision the full legal ownership and title of physical assets used by RNZ Sound Archives at the time of the archive's transfer in 2012. The net book value of radio assets held by Ngā Taonga Sound & Vision was $423,946 on 1 July 2014, dropping to $172,029 on 30 June 2017.

Collection contents
The RNZ Sound Archive collection is made of two distinct parts: the general Radio New Zealand historical collection and Ngā Taonga Kōrero - a collection of Māori and Pacific recordings. All together there are over 110,000 items - both physical items and digital files. The collection includes early audio cylinders, acetate discs, open reel tapes, cassette tapes and digital audio tapes.  The collection also contains publicity materials and documentation relating to the sound collection.

General collection
The RNZ general historical collection dates back to the late 1930s when the State broadcaster established a "special library". 100,000 physical items from the collection were relocated from Christchurch to Wellington as part of the 2016/17 restructure.

Ngā Taonga Kōrero collection
The Ngā Taonga Kōrero collection dates from the early 1960s when the Māori section of the New Zealand Broadcasting Corporation was established.  Leo Fowler and Wiremu Kerekere travelled throughout the country recording hui, marae openings, cultural festivals, welcomes and farewells.  Both raw and edited audio was kept.

For many years the collection was held in Papatoetoe, before moving in 1985 with the associated programme unit, then known as Te Reo o Aotearoa, to RNZ's Cook Street facility.  In the 2000s the audio preservation staff moved with RNZ to a new Hobson Street site and the collection was moved to a purpose-built archive facility at RNZ's transmission site in Henderson. Ngā Taonga Sound & Vision moved the collection to Avalon as part of the 2016/17 restructure.

Sound digitisation project (2013-2015)
As part of the transfer of RNZ Sound Archives to the New Zealand Film Archive (now Ngā Taonga Sound & Vision), the archive received one-off project funding of $1 million from the Ministry for Culture and Heritage for the digitisation of the sound collection over two years.

The project was titled the Sound Archive Digitisation Project and formed part of the Memorandum of Understanding with the Minister for Arts, Culture and Heritage (2012/13). The archive had to submit a plan to the Ministry for how it would use the funding by 15 December 2012.  They also had to report separately on the plan's progress at regular intervals.

Minister for Arts, Culture and Heritage Chris Finlayson said "This is an important project that not only ensures the secure storage and preservation of these important records, but through digitisation will help make the living history contained in the archives more readily accessible." However, in private the money was also seen by some as a contingency fund. The archive had been concerned about taking on the cost of redundancy provisions that the former RNZ Sound Archives staff had under their RNZ employment agreements. Employment contracts at the New Zealand Film Archive did not have redundancy provisions.

In January 2013 the chief executive of the Ministry for Culture and Heritage, Lewis Holden, wrote to the Chair of the New Zealand Film Archive Jane Kominik noting that $141,670 of the digitisation fund could, if required, be retained for a few years and used to cover RNZ Sound Archive staff redundancy payments. Mr Holden stated "provided that the [archive] delivers the services that have been agreed with the Minister, it is free to decide when to spend allocated monies".  Mr Holden went on to state "With respect to one-off transition costs [...] we remain prepared to consider any request for additional relief as a charge against funds from the one-off project."

The New Zealand Film Archive/Ngā Taonga Sound & Vision received from the Ministry for Culture and Heritage $150,000 in 2013, $610,000 in 2014 and $224,000 in 2015 for the radio digitisation project. The archive's Annual Report (2013/14) noted project expenditure of $0 in 2013 and $144,235 in 2014.

The digitisation project was due to begin in July 2013 with the aim of digitising an estimated 20,000 audio items by mid-2015. However technical and methodological issues delayed the project until the start of 2014.
The archive was meant to submit regular monthly reports along with six-monthly updates in 2014 and 2015, plus additional reports in July 2014 and 2015 detailing progress on the project to the Ministry for Culture and Heritage. However, in response to an Official Information Act request in August 2018, the ministry confirmed that it did not hold any reports from the archive relating to the sound digitisation project. It also could not provide an itemized list of expenditure for the project and said it held no further information (other than Lewis Holden's letter) relating to the possible use of project funding for other purposes.

TVNZ Archive collection

The TVNZ Archive collection holds over 600,000 hours of television spanning almost 55 years of New Zealand's public television history. In 2014 the Ministry for Culture and Heritage appointed Ngā Taonga Sound & Vision as the initial Archive Manager to manage the collection on a day-to-day basis. Since then, the archive has failed to comply with preservation and access targets set out in the Memorandum of Understanding (2014-2018) with the Crown.  This has attracted national media and public criticism.

In 2018 the archive announced it was starting work on a project to get the collection online.

Access to the collections

Audiences
Radio broadcasts of collection material have produced the biggest audiences for Ngā Taonga Sound & Vision, with 924,000 listens in a year to a regular archival audio segment during Jessie Mulligan's afternoon radio programme on RNZ National.

Delivery times for re-use

Ngā Taonga Sound & Vision estimates that it would take up to eight weeks to supply a requester with a viewing copy of moving-image material or an item from the documentation collection. This was due to collection material not being production-ready. The 2-month delivery period covered research, retrieval, preparation of material, transfer time, clearances and delivery. Sound items have a faster supply time, with standard orders of up to three items usually available within fifteen days.

In-person access
In its Strategic Plan 2016-2024 published in mid-2016, Ngā Taonga Sound & Vision noted that the archive had a predominantly white, middle-class, Wellington clientele.  The archive had targeted "art-lovers" and film aficionados "at the expense of every other group".

Cinema (Wellington)
Ngā Taonga Sound & Vision run a regular screening programme in the 107-seat cinema of content from the archive's collection. The cinema is also used for educational screenings and can be hired by community organisations and groups. In 2016 the archive itself described the cinema as uncomfortable, cold and not large enough.

Gallery space (Wellington)
A gallery space operated in the Taranaki Street building and featured regularly changing exhibitions.

A news report at the time of Rebecca Elvy's appointment as Chief Executive in 2015, noted that Ngā Taonga Sound & Vision had an extensive range of film-related memorabilia including scripts, advertisements, posters and props, costumes and animation cells which the archive was working to make available via public display. "We want to find a way to share that with the public. There's lots of things that people aren't aware of that they can come take a look at" Ms Elvy said. However the gallery closed in 2015, with the final exhibition highlighting the Pacific Films production company. The exhibition's title was Don't Let It Get You, a reference to the film of the same name.

Media library (Wellington)
Selected titles in the collection can be viewed in the Media Library at the Taranaki Street site. In 2016 the archive noted that the library contained predominantly video formats which were becoming obsolete.

Medianet
Ngā Taonga Sound & Vision operates medianet, a digital video resource that provides access to a small curated selection of film and TV items at sites across New Zealand. In 2012 medianet had 915 moving image titles available. The number of medianet sites dropped from seventeen in 2016 to thirteen in 2018.

Kiosks allow the viewer to browse by category, decade, title or through descriptive tags, and view full-length videos at full screen quality. Playlists provide curated sets of videos of particular interest to local communities. As of 2018, medianet operated in Lower Hutt, Hawke's Bay, Otago, Manawatu, Nelson, Northland, Rotorua, Southland, Taranaki, Tauranga, Waikato and Wellington.

Online access

Mediasphere
Mediasphere is promoted as Ngā Taonga Sound & Vision's education service.  The film-centric website was launched in 2013 and is promoted by the archive as a site where teachers, parents and students can "watch extracts from films, and start thinking about, writing about and making their own films". The site features resources for English, Social Sciences, History, Geography and Media Studies students and teachers.

Ngā Taonga Sound & Vision website
The Minister for Arts, Culture and Heritage Maggie Barry launched Ngā Taonga Sound & Vision's new website in January 2016.  For the first time, the website brought together the collections of the former RNZ Sound Archive and the New Zealand Film Archive. The online catalogue was powered by Supplejack - DigitalNZ's tool for aggregating content.

In 2014 Ngā Taonga Sound & Vision noted that the Ministers of Broadcasting and Arts, Culture and Heritage had an expectation that a substantial proportion of the archive's collections be digitised and made available online by 2018. The archive's Statement of Intent 2015-2018 aimed for 20,000 items online. However the Strategic Plan 2016-2024 published in mid-2016 noted that there was still only a small amount of the collection available online.

Acquisition and deposit
Ngā Taonga Sound & Vision's Strategic Plan 2016-2024 published in mid-2016, noted significant issues with the archive's acquisition and deposit activities. The Strategic Plan noted the Selection and Acquisition Policy was out of date, there were three different deposit agreements and there was a significant backlog of material that hadn't been accessioned/catalogued.  There were also a large number of depositors who had been promised a copy of their items but had not received them - with some waiting over ten-years.

Collecting scope

In 2012 the New Zealand Film Archive noted in a document to the Ministry for Culture and Heritage that the archive not only wanted to combine the existing national collections of film, television and radio but potentially enlarge the archive's mandate by collecting recorded music, oral histories, computer gaming and new audiovisual media.

In February 2017 a revised Selection and Acquisition Policy was published, broadening the scope of what the archive collected.  This included film, television, radio, sound, digital, moving image and sound works created by New Zealand artists, musical works, oral histories, software, live broadcasts, recordings of meetings and recordings of nature such as bird-life.  The archive would also continue to collect equipment, documentation and supporting material - photographs, posters, costumes, books, publicity material etc.

Collection rights
Ngā Taonga Sound & Vision accepts material on deposit.  The depositor can withdraw material at any time, with the rights pertaining to the material unchanged by the act of depositing with the archive.

Ngā Taonga Sound & Vision has three layers of rights clearance: the depositor, the work's copyright holder and the cultural values of iwi and Māori. The archive undertakes to honour the wishes of all rights holders.

Collection care
Ngā Taonga Sound & Vision measures itself against the internationally agreed standards of the Image Permanence Institute (IPI) and the International Association of Sound and Audiovisual Archives (IASA).

In its Selection and Acquisition Policy, the archive undertakes to store collection items in optimum conditions to ensure their long-term survival, document items so that they can be easily found and make them accessible in a way that does not compromise their long-term preservation. In 2012 the archive noted how it had attracted international interest for "its innovative approach to low-cost, high-quality collection storage using technology adapted from the horticulture sector".

Ngā Taonga's 2016/17 Annual Report noted that only 56% of the collection was held in best practice storage conditions, and a 2017 report from the archive to the Ministry for Culture and Heritage noted that the entire film collection was stored in conditions that it considered was below standard. The former Sound Archive's acetate disc collection was also stored in below standard conditions.

See also 
 Cinema of New Zealand
 List of New Zealand films
 Television New Zealand Archive

References

External links 

2012 mergers and acquisitions
2014 mergers and acquisitions
2014 establishments in New Zealand
Film archives in New Zealand
Film organisations in New Zealand
FIAF-affiliated institutions
Television archives
Sound archives
History of radio